The Universidad de Guanajuato (in English, the University of Guanajuato) is a university based in the Mexican state of Guanajuato, made up of about 33,828 students in programs ranging from high school level to the doctorate level.  Over 17,046 of those are pursuing undergraduate, masters, and doctorate degrees.  The university offers 153 academic programs, including 13 doctorates, 39 masters programs, and 65 bachelor's degrees.  The university has schools in fourteen cities throughout the state of Guanajuato.

History
The university traces its history back to the educational institute called the Hospice of the Holy Trinity, which was established on October 1, 1732.  On August 29, 1827, upon the signing of the first constitutional government, the school changed its name to the College of the Immaculate Conception and fell under government responsibility.  Programs founded around this time included Mining, Law, Painting, Sculpture and Architecture.  In 1831, a library was established.

The name of the college changed again in 1867, this time to the National College of Guanajuato.  During the following decade, technical programs at the school grew rapidly, as did research.  Finally, in 1945, the college changed its name to the University of Guanajuato, and the school was granted autonomy by the state legislature beginning on May 21, 1994.

Mission 
Increase, preserve and share all knowledge aimed towards the upright development of the human being, through the preservation of its environment and the construction of a democratic, just and free society.

Vision 
The University of Guanajuato is a public institution offering high school and university education.

Academic structure 

Campus Celaya-Salvatierra
 Division of Health Sciences and Engineering
 Division of Social and Administrative Sciences

Campus Guanajuato
 Division of Architecture, Art and Design
 Division of Economic-Administrative Sciences
 Division of Natural and Exact Sciences
 Division of Social Sciences and Humanities
 Division of Law, Politics and Government
 Division of Engineering

Campus Irapuato-Salamanca

 Division of Life Sciences
 Division of Engineering

Campus León

 Division of Sciences and Engineering
 Division of Health Sciences
 Division of Social Sciences and Humanities

High School System
 Escuela de NIvel Medio Superior de Celaya
 Escuela de NIvel Medio Superior de Guanajuato
 Escuela de NIvel Medio Superior de Irapuato
 Escuela de NIvel Medio Superior de León
 Escuela de NIvel Medio Superior Centro Histórico de León
 Escuela de NIvel Medio Superior de Pénjamo
 Escuela de NIvel Medio Superior de Salamanca
 Escuela de NIvel Medio Superior de Salvatierra
 Escuela de NIvel Medio Superior de San Luis de la Paz
 Escuela de NIvel Medio Superior de Silao

See also
 List of Jesuit sites
List of buildings in Guanajuato City

Notes

References
Background of the University of Guanajuato, accessed December 12, 2010
History of the University of Guanajuato, accessed April 16, 2005

External links

Main Page

 
Educational institutions established in 1732
Guanajuato City
1732 establishments in New Spain